Lee Gi-bum (born 8 August 1970) is a South Korean former footballer.

Club career
Having studied at both the Hyupsung Middle School and Hyupsung High School, Lee attended the Kyungil University between 1989 and 1992. He would go on to forge a career in the top flight of South Korean football, named the K League at the time.

International career
Lee played eleven times for South Korea in 1993, scoring a hat-trick against India in qualification for the 1994 FIFA World Cup.

Coaching career
After retiring from his playing career, Lee went on to manage at a number of middle and high schools, including the two he attended. He also managed at now-defunct club Daegu KAPEC, and has worked as a coach at Daejeon Hana Citizen.

Personal life

Career statistics

Club

Notes

International

International goals
Scores and results list South Korea's goal tally first, score column indicates score after each Lee goal.

References

1970 births
Living people
South Korean footballers
South Korea youth international footballers
South Korea international footballers
Association football midfielders
Seongnam FC players
Ulsan Hyundai FC players
Suwon Samsung Bluewings players
K League 1 players